Medical tourism in Israel is medical tourism in which people travel to Israel for medical treatment, which is emerging as an important destination for medical tourists. In 2006, 15,000 people came to Israel for medical treatment, bringing in $40 million in revenue. In 2010, Israel treated 30,000 medical tourists. The Health Ministry estimates that they inject about NIS 200 million a year into the health system, of which more than NIS 100 million goes to government hospitals. Outside experts put the total much higher, at almost NIS 500 million. 

According to a report in 2013, the number of people from Eastern Europe, Cyprus and the United States seeking treatment at Israel's public and private hospitals is growing. Income from medical tourism was assessed at about $140 million in 2012.

Israel is also frequently the host venue for international medical conferences.

Overview
Medical tourists come to Israel treatments such as surgery and in-vitro fertilization, which  cost considerably less than in their home countries. Israel is the world leader in such procedures. 
Some seek relief for a variety of medical conditions at treatment centers and spas at the Dead Sea, a world-famous therapeutic resort. The quality of Israel’s facilities are recognized throughout the world , with regular contacts maintained on a reciprocal basis with major medical and scientific research centers abroad. Another factor in choosing Israel is the comfortable climate and scenic locations which have a calming effect on patients. People seeking a comfortable and sunny climate have been moving to Israel for years – even Zionist pioneer Eliezer ben Yehuda was driven to move to the area around Jerusalem in part for relief from his tuberculosis.

Treatment options
Patients come to Israel for procedures such as bone marrow transplants, heart surgery and catheterization, oncological and neurological treatments, car accident rehabilitation, orthopedic procedures, and IFV treatment.

Israel has become a major destination for residents of nearby Cyprus in need of bone marrow transplants because the procedure is not available in their home country.

Lower costs
A patient with no health insurance who needs bypass surgery in the United States would spend approximately $120,000, while the same procedure performed in Israel would cost approximately $30,000. In vitro fertilization (IVF) is known for its high success rates and considerably lower costs. IVF costs $3,000–$3,500 in Israel, compared to $16,000–$20,000 in the United States.

Dead Sea treatments 

The Dead Sea area has become a major center for health research and treatment for several reasons. The mineral content of the water, the very low content of pollens and other allergens in the atmosphere, the reduced ultraviolet component of solar radiation, and the higher atmospheric pressure at this great depth each have specific health effects. For example, persons suffering reduced respiratory function from diseases such as cystic fibrosis seem to benefit from the increased atmospheric pressure.

Sufferers of the skin disorder psoriasis also benefit from the ability to sunbathe for long periods in the area due to its position below sea level and subsequent result that many of the sun's harmful UV rays are reduced.

The region's climate and low elevation have made it a popular center for several types of therapies:
 Climatotherapy: Treatment which exploits local climatic features such as  temperature, humidity, sunshine, barometric pressure and special atmospheric constituents.
 Heliotherapy: Treatment that exploits the biological effects of the sun's radiation.
 Thalassotherapy: Treatment that exploits bathing in Dead Sea water.

Mud from the Dead Sea is believed to have therapeutic benefits for skin disorders and other physical ailments.

Medical tourism brokers
The medical tourism industry in Israel has created a need for medical tourism brokers. These agents are something between travel agents and medical coordinators. They facilitate the process of receiving medical care in a foreign country by aiding in everything from the purchase of plane tickets, to the facilitation of the whole medical process. They also specialize in organizing entertainment by offering trips/tours all over Israel. Usually, they earn their pay by receiving a brokerage fee from the doctors and do not cost anything to the patient. If one does not have family or close friends in Israel, this is the easiest way to benefit from medical tourism in Israel.

See also
Tourism in Israel
List of hospitals in Israel
Health care in Israel

References

Tourism in Israel
Israel
Healthcare in Israel

he:תיירות מרפא#תיירות מרפא בישראל